Hjellestad is a neighborhood of Bergen, Norway, situated in the borough of Ytrebygda. From Hjellestad there is a ferry to Bjelkarøy, Lerøy and Klokkarvik. Bergen Airport, Hjellestad was situated there from 1948 to 1951.

References

Neighbourhoods of Bergen